WD repeat-containing protein 33 is a protein that in humans is encoded by the WDR33 gene.

This gene encodes a member of the WD repeat protein family. WD repeats are minimally conserved regions of approximately 40 amino acids typically bracketed by gly-his and trp-asp (GH-WD), which may facilitate formation of heterotrimeric or multiprotein complexes. Members of this family are involved in a variety of cellular processes, including cell cycle progression, signal transduction, apoptosis, and gene regulation. This gene is highly expressed in testis and the protein is localized to the nucleus. This gene may play important roles in the mechanisms of cytodifferentiation and/or DNA recombination. Multiple alternatively spliced transcript variants encoding distinct isoforms have been found for this gene.

References

Further reading